128 may refer to
128 (number), a natural number
AD 128, a year in the 2nd century AD
128 BC, a year in the 2nd century BC
128 (New Jersey bus)

See also
 List of highways numbered 
 
 12/8 (disambiguation)